Elmer Austin Benson (September 22, 1895 March 13, 1985) was an American lawyer and politician from Minnesota. In 1935, Benson was appointed to the U.S. Senate following the death of Thomas Schall. He served as the 24th governor of Minnesota, defeating Republican Martin Nelson in a landslide in Minnesota's 1936 gubernatorial election. He lost the governorship two years later to Republican Harold Stassen in the 1938 gubernatorial election.

Education
Born in 1895 in Appleton, Minnesota, Benson studied law at William Mitchell College of Law (then the St. Paul College of Law) and served for a year in the U.S. Army during World War I. He never practiced law after returning from active duty, choosing instead to pursue a banking and business career.

Olson's ally
Benson was a close ally of Governor Floyd B. Olson, another member of the Farmer-Labor Party, who helped orchestrate Benson's political rise. Olson appointed Benson state Commissioner of Securities before choosing him to replace Thomas D. Schall in the United States Senate after Schall's death in December 1935. Benson served in the 74th congress, until November 3, 1936.

Governor of Minnesota
After Olson's premature death from cancer in 1936 and the interregnum of Lieutenant Governor Hjalmar Petersen, Benson stepped into the breach and was elected the 24th governor of Minnesota by the largest margin in state history. He served as the 24th governor of Minnesota from January 4, 1937, to January 2, 1939. His defeat by a record margin in 1938 is seen as the end of the Farmer-Labor Party as an independent political force and a setback for progressive politics in Minnesota. In 1940, he ran for the United States Senate against Henrik Shipstead, an incumbent senator who defected from the Farmer-Labor Party to join the Republicans. Benson took second place, receiving 25% of the vote, in a race that also involved a Democrat, while Shipstead was reelected. He ran for the Senate for the last time in 1942, losing to Republican Joseph H. Ball in a four-way race.

DFL Party
Benson was also the chief figure behind a schism within the DFL Party in Minnesota between 1946 and 1948. The DFL (Democratic-Farmer-Labor Party) had been created in 1944 with the merging of the Minnesota Democratic Party and the Farmer-Labor Party. Benson and his supporters actively took control of the party's main committee in 1946, but were displaced by the supporters of Hubert H. Humphrey (then the mayor of Minneapolis) in 1948. The influence of Humphrey and his supporters had grown significantly within the party between 1946 and 1948 due to Humphrey's popularity and his work through the ADA, the state farm co-ops, and support from the national arm of the CIO. Humphrey's group of supporters—which included such future DFL political stars as Arthur Naftalin, Orville Freeman, and Walter Mondale—wrested control of the DFL from Benson's supporters at a February 1948 party convention. Humphrey's later successful Senate campaign signaled a significant victory for his faction within the fledgling DFL Party and the defeat of Benson's candidates in the DFL primaries. The 1948 schism eventually led Benson and his supporters to leave the DFL.

Death
Before ill health drove him from the public arena, Benson became a force within the short-lived Progressive Party, managing the 1948 presidential campaign of its candidate, Henry Wallace. Benson died in 1985 in Minneapolis, and is buried at the Appleton Cemetery in the town of his birth, Appleton, Minnesota.

Further reading
 Benson, Elmer A. "Politics in My Lifetime." Minnesota History 47 (1980): 154–60. online
 Haynes, John Earl. Dubious alliance: the making of Minnesota's DFL Party (U of Minnesota Press, 1984)
 Lovin, Hugh T. "The Fall of Farmer-Labor Parties, 1936-1938." Pacific Northwest Quarterly (1971): 16–26. in JSTOR
 Sofchalk, Donald G. "Union and Ethnic Group Influence in the 1938 Election on the Minnesota Iron Ranges." Journal of the West (2003) 42#3 pp: 66–74. Retrieved on 2009-5-18

References

1895 births
1985 deaths
People from Appleton, Minnesota
Governors of Minnesota
American Lutherans
United States Army soldiers
United States senators from Minnesota
Farmer–Labor Party United States senators
Minnesota Farmer–Laborites
William Mitchell College of Law alumni
Minnesota lawyers
United States Army personnel of World War I
Farmer–Labor Party state governors of the United States
Democratic Party governors of Minnesota
20th-century American politicians
American political party founders
20th-century American lawyers
20th-century Lutherans